Digha is a seaside resort town in West Bengal, India

Digha may also refer to:

Digha, Nadia, a census town in Nadia district, West Bengal
Digha, Navi Mumbai, a township near Airoli in Navi Mumbai, India
Digha, North 24 Parganas, a census town in North 24 Parganas district, West Bengal, India
Digha, Patna, a neighbourhood in Patna, Bihar, India
Digha Assembly constituency, a constituency of the Bihar Legislative Assembly
Digha–Sonpur Bridge, a rail and road bridge across the Ganges in Saran district, Bihar, India
Digha, Raebareli, a village in Raebareli district, Uttar Pradesh, India